Packet of Three, re-titled as Packing Them In for the second series, is a comedy series broadcast by Channel 4 between 2 August 1991 and 4 November 1992. It starred Frank Skinner, Jenny Eclair and Henry Normal. It was set in the fictional Crumpsall Palladium with scenes filmed at Wakefield's Theatre Royal in front of a live theatre audience. For the re-titled second series, Normal was replaced by Roger Mann and Kevin Eldon.

References
Article on BBC Comedy Guide by Mark Lewisohn

External links

1991 British television series debuts
1992 British television series endings
1990s British sitcoms
Channel 4 sitcoms
English-language television shows